The Lower Savage Islands are an uninhabited offshore island group of Baffin Island, located in the Arctic Archipelago in the territory of Nunavut. The islands lie in the Gabriel Strait, an arm of Davis Strait, northwest of Resolution Island, and west of Edgell Island.

References 

Islands of Hudson Strait
Uninhabited islands of Qikiqtaaluk Region